Richard Martin Walker (born 8 November 1977) is an English former footballer who played as a forward for Devon and Exeter League club Beer Albion.

Career

Early career
Walker started his career at Aston Villa in 1997. Here, he scored a goal against Arsenal, one of the highest points of his Villa career. After loan spells with Cambridge United, Blackpool and Wycombe Wanderers, he signed for the Seasiders in 2001. He helped Blackpool win the 2001–02 Football League Trophy, playing as a substitute in the final. Walker was loaned out to Northampton Town and Oxford United in the 2003–04 season, before joining Bristol Rovers in the summer of 2004.

Bristol Rovers

A natural goalscorer, he formed a formidable partnership with Junior Agogo before the Ghanaian was sold to Nottingham Forest. Walker scored two goals in the 2007 League Two Play-off Final against Shrewsbury at Wembley, as the Gasheads secured a 3–1 victory to send them up to League One.

Walker was placed on the transfer list at the end of the 2007–08 season, having scored only four goals in that season, all from the penalty spot. He joined Shrewsbury on a full-season loan in the summer of 2008, taking him up to the expiry of his contract with Bristol Rovers.

Burton Albion
Following the expiry of his Bristol Rovers contract, he joined newly promoted Burton Albion in July 2009 on a two-year contract, he scored 4 goals in 35 games for the club before his release in May 2011.

Solihull Moors
On 9 September 2011, Solihull Moors announced the signing of Richard Walker. He made his debut the following day in a 1–0 away win at Boston United. He scored his first goal for the club on 17 September 2011, opening the scoring as Solihull overcame Altrincham 2–0 at Damson Park.

Post-retirement
After having played less than a season of Conference North football, he opted to move with his family to Devon in April 2012. Following his retirement, Walker has worked in a large warehouse for Axminster Tools.

He ended the season playing for Beer Albion in the Premier Division of the Devon & Exeter Football League, at level 12 of the league system, some six levels below the team where he had begun the year. He was recruited for Beer by a colleague who played for the team, and who convinced Richard to play alongside him. In August 2019, Walker was announced to have stepped away from the role of player-manager, staying on at the club as a player alongside his son Jamie.

Career statistics

Honours
Blackpool
Football League Trophy winner: 2002

Crewe Alexandra
Football League Second Division runner-up: 2002–03

 Bristol Rovers
Football League Trophy runner up: 2007
Football League Two play-off winner: 2007

References

External links

Richard Walker player profile at bristolrovers.co.uk
Richard Walker player profile at shrewsburytown.com
Richard Walker player profile at oufc.co.uk
Richard Walker player profile at ntfc.co.uk
Richard Walker  player profile at blackpoolfc.co.uk

1977 births
Living people
Footballers from Birmingham, West Midlands
English footballers
Association football forwards
Aston Villa F.C. players
Cambridge United F.C. players
Blackpool F.C. players
Wycombe Wanderers F.C. players
Northampton Town F.C. players
Oxford United F.C. players
Bristol Rovers F.C. players
Shrewsbury Town F.C. players
Burton Albion F.C. players
Solihull Moors F.C. players
Premier League players
English Football League players
National League (English football) players